Remarkable Creatures may refer to:

 Remarkable Creatures, a novel by Tracy Chevalier
 Remarkable Creatures, a book and monthly New York Times column by Sean B. Carroll